This is a list of Argentine films released in 2022.

Films

References

2022
Argentina